(born September 14, 1998) is a Japanese professional wrestler currently signed to World Wonder Ring Stardom promotion, Since making her debut on August 12, 2018, she became a one-time World of Stardom Champion, two-time Goddesses of Stardom Champion, one-time Artist of Stardom Champion, one-time Future of Stardom Champion and one-time SWA Undisputed World Women's Champion, while also having won the Goddesses of Stardom Tag League in 2018 and the Trios Tag Team Tournament in 2019. Hayashishita is also a former one-time Pro-Wrestling: EVE International Champion.

Early life 
From 2006 to 2013, Hayashishita was featured in a reality show that documented her 12-person family. Hayashishita reportedly first got interested in professional wrestling during her days in her third year of junior high school after watching Tajiri with her family when he was at WWE. After graduating high school, she would take auditions in the Stardom dojo while also paying school expenses for her sisters by working in a restaurant. Utami holds a black belt degree in judo.

Professional wrestling career

World Wonder Ring Stardom (2018–present) 
After attending Yoshihiro Tajiri’s homecoming show, Hayashishita began to train at World Wonder Ring Stardom in March 2018. On August 12, 2018, Hayashishita debuted at Stardom when she wrestled Jungle Kyona to a time-limit draw. On August 18, Hayashishita entered the 5★Star GP tournament. Hayashishita managed to win her way to the finals where she lost to Mayu Iwatani. After winning the Goddesses of Stardom Tag League with Momo Watanabe on November 4, Hayashishita won her first title where she and Watanabe defeated J.A.N. (Kyona and Natsuko Tora) to win the Goddess of Stardom Championship on November 23. Hayashishita joined afterwards to Watanabe's unit "Queen's Quest".

On January 3, 2019, Hayashishita defeated Starlight Kid to win the Future of Stardom Championship. On January 5, Hayashishita, along with fellow Queen's Quest members Bea Priestley and Viper, won the one-day Trios Tag Team Tournament. On January 14, Hayashishita defeated Viper to win the Pro-Wrestling: EVE International Championship and the SWA Undisputed World Women's Championship, making her a quadruple champion. On April 5, Hayashishita participated in Stardom's first event at the United States in New York City where she unsuccessfully challenged her tag team partner Watanabe for the Wonder of Stardom Championship. On June 30, during Pro Wrestling: Eve's Wrestle Queendom 2, Hayashishita lost the International Championship to Jamie Hayter in a three-way elimination match, which also involved Nina Samuels, ending her reign at 167 days. On July 15, Hayashishita and Watanabe lost the Goddess of Stardom Championship to Tokyo Cyber Squad (Konami and Kyona), ending their reign at 234 days with six successful title defenses. As Hayashishita competed in the annual 5★Star GP, Stardom announced on September 7 that Hayashishita won't compete in the tournament any longer after suffering a finger injury. Hayashishita returned on November 15 where she teamed with Leo Onozaki, as both unsuccessfully challenged Oedo Tai (Hazuki and Tora). On November 23, Hayashishita, along with AZM an Watanabe, defeated Oedo Tai (Andras Miyagi, Kagetsu and Natsu Sumire) to win the Artist of Stardom Championship.

On January 19, 2020, on the 9th Anniversary show of Stardom, Hayashishita was unsuccessful to win the Wonder of Stardom Championship from Arisa Hoshiki. On January 26, Hayashishita lost the SWA Undisputed World Women's Championship to Jamie Hayter and on February 8, by teaming up with AZM and Momo Watanabe, she lost the Artist of Stardom Championship to Donna del Mondo (Giulia, Maika and Syuri). On February 16, after successfully defending the Future of Stardom Championship against Saya Kamitani, Hayashishita vacated the championship in order to pursue the Wonder of Stardom and the World of Stardom Championship. While Hayashishita and Watanabe were unable to win the Goddess of Stardom Championship from Oedo Tai's (Jamie Hayter and Bea Priestley) on March 8, Hayashishita did win the title with Kamitani on July 26 at Cinderella Summer in Tokyo. On September 19, Hayashishita won the 5★Star GP after defeating Himeka in the finals. On November 15, Hayashishita won the World of Stardom Championship after defeating Iwatani. Hayashishita had her first successful title defense on December 20 at Stardom Osaka Dream Cinderella 2020 against fellow Queen's Quest member Watanabe. On December 27, Hayashishita and Kamitani lost the Goddess of Stardom Championship to Konami and Priestley, ending their reign at 153 days. 

At Stardom 10th Anniversary Show on March 3, 2021, she successfully defended the World of Stardom Championship against her Queen's Quest stablemate Saya Kamitani. A month later at Stardom Yokohama Dream Cinderella 2021 which took place on April 4, Hayashishita scored a victory over Bea Priestley, therefore successfully defending her championship in the latter's last match for the promotion. On the first night of the Stardom Cinderella Tournament 2021 from April 10, she defeated Mina Shirakawa in a first-round non-title match. On the second night from May 14 she fell short to Syuri in a second-round match. On the third night from May 14, Hayashishita successfully defended the World of Stardom Championship against Syuri two times after the both competitors requested the restart of the match after it went into a 30-minute time-limit draw. This was sanctioned as only one valid defense for Hayashishita. The first match between Syuri and Hayashishita received a 5.5 stars rating from Dave Meltzer, making it the highest-rated match in the history of women's professional wrestling till it's date.  At Yokohama Dream Cinderella 2021 in Summer on July 4, Hayashishita successfully defended the "red belt" against Natsuko Tora by doctor stoppage after the latter suffered a legitimate knee injury during the match. Hayashishita competed in the Stardom 5 Star Grand Prix 2021 between July 31 and September 25, placing herself in the "Blue Stars" Block where she scored a total of 10 points after competing against Syuri, Saya Kamitani, Takumi Iroha, Konami, Tam Nakano, Maika, Unagi Sayaka, AZM and Ruaka. At Stardom 10th Anniversary Grand Final Osaka Dream Cinderella on October 9, 2021, she successfully defended the red belt against Takumi Iroha who competed as a guest from Marvelous That's Women Wrestling. At Kawasaki Super Wars, the first night of the Stardom Super Wars trilogy of events which took place on November 3, 2021, Hayashishita defended her world title against a returning Hazuki. At Tokyo Super Wars on November 27, she defended the title again successfully against Maika. At Osaka Super Wars, the last event from the trilogy from December 18, she teamed up with Queen's Quest stablemates AZM, Saya Kamitani and the team's captain Momo Watanabe to battle Oedo Tai's Starlight Kid, Saki Kashima, Konami and Ruaka in an elimination tag team match. While down to Kid versus Watanabe, the latter betrayed the stable and attacked AZM with a steel chair to get herself disqualified in a shocking manner to join the enemy team. The former Queen's Quest leader declared that she would be Oedo Tai's black peach (reference to her real Japanese name Momo (モモ) meaning peach). At Stardom Dream Queendom on December 29, 2021, Hayashishita dropped the world title to Syuri in a winner-takes-all match also for the SWA World Championship. Syuri earned the right to challenge Hayashishita after winning the 2021 5 Star Grand Prix, ending the latter's reign at 409 days.

At Stardom Nagoya Supreme Fight on January 29, 2022, Hayashishita teamed up with AZM, falling short to Momo Watanabe and Starlight Kid. At Stardom Award in Shinjuku on January 3, 2022, AZM, Kamitani and Hayashishita engaged in a brawl with Oedo Tai after their match against Fukigen Death, Saki Kashima and Ruaka. Obviously outnumbered, the three members of Queen's Quest reveiced help from Lady C who rushed down the ring to try to save them. After Oedo Tai retreated, Hayashishita offered C a spot into the unit which the latter accepted so she was later announced to join the stable in the process. At Stardom Cinderella Journey on February 23, 2022, she teamed up with Lady C in a losing effort against Starlight Kid and Ruaka. At Stardom New Blood 1 on March 11, 2022, Hayashishita defeated the debuting Miyu Amasaki. Despite the latter's loss, Hayashishita was so impressed by Amasaki's performance that she offered her a spot into Queen's Quest which Amasaki accepted. On the first night of the Stardom World Climax 2022 from Mach 26, Hayashishita unsuccessfully challenged Saya Kamitani for the Wonder of Stardom Championship. On the second night from March 27, she defeated Mirai. At the Stardom Cinderella Tournament 2022, Hayashishita wrestled Tam Nakano into a time-limit draw in the first round matches from April 3. At Stardom Golden Week Fight Tour on May 5, 2022, she teamed up with AZM and Lady C in a losing effort to Tam Nakano, Mina Shirakawa and Unagi Sayaka. On May 15, 2022, a five-way match between Lady C, AZM, Saya Kamitani, Hina and Utami Hayashishita took place to determine the new leader of the unit, to end the leaderless period of almost six months after Momo Watanabe's defection to Oedo Tai. Hayashishita won the match, therefore becoming the fourth (AZM was said to be the third de facto leader) and elected leader of Queen's Quest. At Stardom Flashing Champions on May 28, 2022, Hayashiahita teamed up with Miyu Amsaski in a losing effort against Tam Nakano and Kairi. At Stardom Fight in the Top on June 26, 2022, Hayashishita teamed up with AZM and Saya Kamitani in a losing effort against Stars (Mayu Iwatani, Koguma and Hazuki) as a result of a Six-woman tag team steel cage match.  At Mid Summer Champions in Tokyo, the first event of the Stardom Mid Summer Champions series from July 9, 2022, she teamed up with Miyu Amasaki in a losign effort against God's Eye (Mirai and Ami Sourei). At Stardom x Stardom: Nagoya Midsummer Encounter on August 21, 2022, she teamed with AZM and Lady C to defeat Mayu Iwatani, Saya Iida and Momo Kohgo. At Stardom in Showcase vol.2 on September 25, 2022, Hayashishita teamed up with Lady C and Syuri as the Rossy Ogawa Bodyguard Army in a losing effort against Grim Reaper Army (Yuu, Nanae Takahashi and Yuna Manase).

New Japan Pro Wrestling (2021)
On January 5, 2021, at the second night of New Japan Pro-Wrestling (NJPW)'s Wrestle Kingdom 15, Hayashishita made her first NJPW appearance where she, alongside AZM and Saya Kamitani, defeated Himeka, Maika and Natsupoi in a dark match.

Other media

Filmography

Television 
 2006–2013: Tsuukai! Big Daddy (痛快!ビッグダディ)

Championships and accomplishments 
 Pro-Wrestling: EVE
 Pro-Wrestling: EVE International Championship (1 time)
 Pro Wrestling Illustrated
 Ranked No. 2 of the top 150 female wrestlers in the PWI Women's 150 in 2021
 Ranked No. 20 of the top 50 tag teams in the PWI Tag Team 50 in 2020 
 Tokyo Sports
 Newcomer Award (2018)
Women's Wrestling Grand Prize (2021)
 World Wonder Ring Stardom
 World of Stardom Championship (1 time)
 Goddess of Stardom Championship (2 times) – with Momo Watanabe (1) and Saya Kamitani (1)
 Artist of Stardom Championship (1 time) – with AZM and Momo Watanabe
 Future of Stardom Championship (1 time)
 SWA World Championship (1 time)
 5★Star GP (2020)
 Goddesses of Stardom Tag League (2018) – Momo Watanabe
 Rookie of the Year (2018)
 Trios Tag Team Tournament (2019) with Bea Priestley and Viper
 5★Star GP Award (1 time)
 5★Star GP Best Match Award (2020) 
 Stardom Year-End Award (5 times)
 Best Match Awards (2020) 
 Best Tag Team Award  (2018)  (2020)
 Most Valuable Player Award (2021)
 Outstanding Performance Award (2018)
 Wrestling Observer Newsletter Awards
 Woman’s Wrestling MVP (2021)

References

External links 
 World Wonder Ring Stardom profile 
 

1998 births
Living people
21st-century professional wrestlers
Japanese female professional wrestlers
People from Kagoshima Prefecture
Sportspeople from Kagoshima Prefecture
World of Stardom Champions
Goddess of Stardom Champions
Artist of Stardom Champions
SWA World Champions
Future of Stardom Champions